Synaphea boyaginensis is a shrub endemic to Western Australia.

It blooms between September and October producing yellow flowers.

It is found in the Wheatbelt region of Western Australia between York and Wandering where it grows in gravel-clay-loam soils.

References

Eudicots of Western Australia
boyaginensis
Endemic flora of Western Australia
Plants described in 1995